Lists of historical members of the Privy Council for Canada cover former members of the Privy Council for Canada, which provides advice to the monarch of Canada on state and constitutional affairs. The lists are organized by period.

List of members of the Privy Council for Canada (1867–1911)
List of members of the Privy Council for Canada (1911–48)
List of members of the Privy Council for Canada (1948–68)
List of members of the Privy Council for Canada (1968–2005)
List of members of the Privy Council for Canada (2006–present)

See also
 List of current members of the King's Privy Council for Canada